Rakesh Pratap Singh  (born 30 June 1976) is an Indian politician and a member of the 18th Uttar Pradesh Assembly from Gauriganj constituency. He is a member of Samajwadi Party. Singh was elected for the first time in the 2012 Uttar Pradesh election, an accomplishment he repeated in 2017. He resigned on 31 October 2021 citing "non-fulfilment of promises" by the government.

Personal life
Singh was born on 30 June 1976 to Tej Pratap Singh in Mau, Gauriganj of Amethi district in Uttar Pradesh. He completed High School in 1991 from SPIC Raniganj Kaithaula Pratapgarh. Singh married Shilam Singh on 1 June 1996, with whom he has a son and a daughter. He is an agriculturalist and industrialist by profession.

Political career
Singh has served three terms as an MLA in the Uttar Pradesh Legislative Assembly from Gauriganj. In 2012 Uttar Pradesh Legislative Assembly election, he defeated his nearest rival Mohammad Nayeem of Indian National Congress after securing 44,287 votes, succeeding Chandra Prakash of Bahujan Samaj Party in the process. In 2017 Uttar Pradesh Legislative Assembly election, he repeated this by defeating Nayeem again, but with a much larger margin, securing 77,915 votes.

On 31 October 2021, Singh resigned from the 17th Uttar Pradesh Assembly citing "non-fulfilment of promises" by the ruling Bharatiya Janata Party government.

In the 2022 Uttar Pradesh Legislative Assembly election, Singh defeated Bharatiya Janata Party's Chandra Prakash Mishra Matiyari by a margin of 6,963 votes.

References

1976 births
Living people
People from Amethi district
Samajwadi Party politicians from Uttar Pradesh
Uttar Pradesh MLAs 2012–2017
Uttar Pradesh MLAs 2017–2022
Uttar Pradesh MLAs 2022–2027